Paul Lee Foshee (November 12, 1932 – November 8, 2020) was an American politician. He served as a Democratic member of the Louisiana House of Representatives and as a member of the Louisiana State Senate.

Foshee was born in Natchitoches, Louisiana, the son of Mamie Lee Smith and George W. Foshee. He attended Natchitoches Central High School, where he graduated in 1950. He then worked as a crop duster at his own business, Foshee Dusting Company. He attended Northwestern State University, earning a bachelor's degree in business in 1961.

In 1960 Foshee was elected to the Louisiana House of Representatives, serving until 1964. In 1972 Foshee was elected to the Louisiana State Senate, where he served until 1976.

Foshee died in November 2020 at his home in Natchitoches, Louisiana, at the age of 87. He was buried in Fern Park Cemetery.

References 

1932 births
2020 deaths
20th-century American politicians
Politicians from Natchitoches, Louisiana
Democratic Party Louisiana state senators
Democratic Party members of the Louisiana House of Representatives
Businesspeople from Louisiana
Burials in Louisiana